Paul Adam Wilson (born 22 February 1977) is an English retired professional footballer who made two league appearances for Gillingham at the end of the 1994–95 season. He later played in non-league football with Gravesend & Northfleet and Margate.

References

1977 births
Living people
Sportspeople from Maidstone
Gillingham F.C. players
Ebbsfleet United F.C. players
Margate F.C. players
English footballers
Association football forwards